Rudolf Gallati (16 April 1845, in Glarus – 3 November 1904) was a Swiss politician and President of the Swiss National Council (1896).

External links 
 
 

1845 births
1904 deaths
People from Glarus
Swiss Calvinist and Reformed Christians
Free Democratic Party of Switzerland politicians
Members of the National Council (Switzerland)
Presidents of the National Council (Switzerland)
Swiss military officers